Afra Koti (also Romanized as Āfrā Kotī) is a village in Firuzjah Rural District, Bandpey-ye Sharqi District, Babol County, Mazandaran Province, Iran. At the 2006 census, its population was 74, in 20 families.

References 

Populated places in Babol County